The Santa Barbara Symphony is a professional symphony orchestra and register 501(c)3 nonprofit organization based in Santa Barbara, California.

The orchestra was founded in 1953. Music directors have included Erno Daniel (1960–1967), who also taught piano at the University of California, Santa Barbara, Ronald Ondrejka (1967–1979), who taught conducting at UCSB, Frank Collura (1979–1984), Varujan Kojian (1985–93), Gisele Ben-Dor (1994–2005), and Nir Kabaretti (2006–present).

In the 1990s the orchestra began releasing recordings, including CDs of works by Silvestre Revueltas, Astor Piazzolla, Luis Bacalov and Heitor Villa-Lobos.

Typically the orchestra performs a series of about seven concerts during a season, plus additional concerts, for example, a Pops music and stage performance on New Year's Eve. 

In 2008, the Santa Barbara Symphony moved from its long-time venue at the Arlington Theatre to the newly renovated Granada Theatre.

References 
 History of the Santa Barbara Symphony

External links 
 

Musical groups established in 1953
Santa Barbara Symphony Orchestra
Orchestras based in California